The CS 27 is a Canadian sailboat, that was designed by Raymond Wall and first built in 1975. The design is out of production.

Production
The boat was built by CS Yachts in Canada, with 480 examples completed between 1975 and 1983, when production ended.

Design
The CS 27 is a small recreational keelboat, built predominantly of fibreglass. It has a masthead sloop rig, a transom-hung rudder and a fixed fin keel. It displaces  and carries  of ballast.

About 90 were built with the shoal draft keel.

The boat was initially fitted with a Japanese Yanmar YSE diesel engine and later a Yanmar 1GM model.

In 1977 an increased area rudder with  more added to the leading edge for better helm balance was introduced and this new rudder design could be retrofitted to older boats. In 1980 the mast was changed from a Proctor to an Isomat section along with small interior improvements.

The boat has a PHRF racing average handicap of 207 with a high of 204 and low of 216.

Operational history
Notable examples include the CS 27 Sea Weasel which achieved a second place in West Vancouver Yacht Club's 2014 Southern Straits Classic.

In a review Michael McGoldrick wrote, "Boats with a length of twenty-seven feet and a displacement topping 6000 pounds will generally have more in common with 30 footers than the outboard powered boats in the 25 to 26 foot range. This is certainly true of the CS 27. It is a fast boat with real adult size room below decks, and it comes with an inboard diesel, double lifelines, two speed winches, a pressurized fresh water system, and a huge 5.8 cubic foot ice box. The CS 27 is a sleek boat that was built strong enough for some serious ocean sailing."

See also

List of sailing boat types

Similar sailboats
Aloha 27
Cal 27
Cal 2-27
Cal 3-27
Catalina 27
Catalina 270
Catalina 275 Sport
C&C 27
Crown 28
Edel 820
Express 27
Fantasia 27
Halman Horizon
Hotfoot 27
Hullmaster 27
Hunter 27
Hunter 27-2
Hunter 27-3
Irwin 27 
Island Packet 27
Mirage 27 (Perry)
Mirage 27 (Schmidt)
Mirage 275
O'Day 272
Orion 27-2
Watkins 27
Watkins 27P

References

External links

Keelboats
1970s sailboat type designs
Sailing yachts
Sailboat type designs by Raymond Wall
Sailboat types built by CS Yachts